The Nelson Mandela Foundation is a non-profit organisation founded by Nelson Mandela in 1999 to promote Mandela's vision of freedom and equality for all. The chairman is professor Njabulo Ndebele.

Vision
The vision of Nelson Mandela Foundation is to contribute to building a society that remembers its past, listens to all voices, and pursues social justice for all.
he was born on the 18th of July 1918, in a village called Mvezo in the Transkei area of southern Africa.
He established the Truth and Commission, providing a safe place to investigate post-human abuses, avoiding civil wars, and bloodshed. 
he established measures to combat poverty and expand health care services. he stated that what counts in life is not the mere fact that we have lived.
it is what difference we have made to the lives of others that will determine the significance of the life we lead.
He aided the South African Reserve Bank in slashing inflation by more than 7% in 5 years he used sports to bring the racially divided country together.
He helped to lead the ANC (African National Congress) in the 1952 campaign for the defence of Unjust laws. He prompted the manifesto known as the Freedom Charter

History 
The foundation was created in 1999 by Nelson Mandela when he stepped down as the President of South Africa.

In 2012, the foundation broke its apolitical role by criticising Jacob Zuma for weakening the state institutions.

Following Robert Mugabe's attacks towards the legacy of Nelson Mandela in 2017, the Foundation responded by asking Mugabe to base his accusations on facts.

Annual Lecture
The Nelson Mandela Foundation organises an annual lecture, inviting prominent people to drive debate on significant social issues.
 2003 – Bill Clinton
 2004 – Desmond Tutu
 2005 – Wangari Maathai
 2006 – Thabo Mbeki
 2007 – Kofi Annan
 2008 – Ellen Johnson-Sirleaf
 2009 – Muhammad Yunus
 2010 – Ariel Dorfman
 2011 – Ismail Serageldin
 2012 – Mary Robinson
 2013 – Mo Ibrahim
 2014 – Michelle Bachelet
 2015 – Thomas Piketty
 2016 – Bill Gates
 2017 – Amina J. Mohammed
 2018 – Barack Obama
 2019 – Mogoeng Mogoeng
 2020 – António Guterres
 2021 – Fatou Bensouda
 2022 – Mia Mottley

See also
Mandela Day

References

Organizations established in 1999
1999 establishments in South Africa
Nelson Mandela
Non-profit organisations based in South Africa